Preach On Sister, Preach On! is the third solo album by American comic and actress LaWanda Page, her fourth release overall (including a collaboration album with the comic duo Skillet & Leroy under the title, Back Door Daddy) under the eponymous stage name "LaWanda".

The album featured her revising the raunchy preacher monologues first introduced on her most popular release, Watch It, Sucker!, including explicit-infused bits on classic Bible stories. The most famous bit of the album, however, includes the comic's monologue on "Sister Bessie and Brother Harold", describing two people engaged in an hours-long sexual intercourse.

Like in her previous albums, LaWanda is introduced as The Queen of Comedy.

Track listing
"Adam and Eve"
"Methuselah"
"Moses"
"Sampson and Delilah"
"David and Goliath"
"Elijah"
"Jeremiah"
"Paul"
"Brother Harold"
"Can I Get An Amen!"
"Dog Fashion"
"The Good Hoe"
"Virgins"
"Rachel"

1973 albums
LaWanda Page albums
Laff Records albums